The monarchy of Fiji arose in the nineteenth century, when native ruler Seru Epenisa Cakobau consolidated control of the Fijian Islands in 1871 and declared himself King or paramount chief of Fiji. In 1874, he voluntarily ceded sovereignty of the islands to Britain, which made Fiji a crown colony within the British Empire.

After nearly a century of British rule, Fiji became a Dominion, an independent sovereign state within the Commonwealth of Nations with Elizabeth II as head of state on 10 October 1970. After a second military coup in 1987 led by Lieutenant Colonel Sitiveni Rabuka, Fiji became a republic, and the monarchy was ended.

Nevertheless, the Great Council of Chiefs recognised Elizabeth II as Tui Viti or the traditional Queen of Fiji, but the position was not one of a constitutional, or otherwise legal nature. The Great Council of Chiefs was disestablished in 2012 by decree of President Ratu Epeli Nailatikau. Elizabeth II did not use the title, and the Fijian government did not recognise it either.

History

Reign of Seru Epenisa Cakobau (1871–1874)

Seru Epenisa, known as "Cakobau", or "destroyer of Bau", ruled the short lived Kingdom of Fiji (1871–1874) as Tui Viti, which translates as "King of Fiji" or "paramount chief of Fiji".

On 8 December 1852, Cakobau succeeded as Vunivalu of Bau. Claiming that Bau had suzerainty over the remainder of Fiji, he asserted that he was the King of Fiji. However, Cakobau's claim was not accepted by other chiefs, who regarded him, at best, as the first among equals. Cakobau consequently engaged in constant warfare for almost nineteen years to unify the islands under his authority.

Supported by foreign settlers, he finally succeeded in creating a united Fijian kingdom in 1871, and established Levuka as his capital. He decided to set up a constitutional monarchy, and the first legislative assembly met in November of that year. Both the legislature and the Cabinet were dominated by foreigners. He gave his war club to Queen Victoria on 10 October 1874, when he signed the Deed of Cession, that granted the British Empire sovereignty over the islands in 1874.

Reign of Queen Elizabeth II (1970–1987)

In 1970, 96 years of British rule came to an end, and Fiji became an independent sovereign state within the Commonwealth of Nations. The official name of the state was the "Dominion of Fiji". Fiji's Head of State was Elizabeth II, who was represented by a Governor-General and was also queen of other countries, such as Australia, Canada, New Zealand, and the United Kingdom. The queen's realms were all independent from one another, and the Queen acted independently in each realm, but they shared the same person as monarch. As a constitutional monarchy, executive power was held by a prime minister, usually the leader of the majority party in an elected legislature. The prime minister was appointed by the Governor-General of Fiji.

Republic

On 14 May 1987, a coup led by Sitiveni Rabuka resulted in the overthrow of the government of Fijian Prime Minister Timoci Bavadra, elected at the 1987 Fijian general election.

The Supreme Court of Fiji ruled the coup unconstitutional, and the Queen's viceregal representative, the Governor-General of Fiji Ratu Sir Penaia Ganilau, unsuccessfully attempted to assert executive power. He opened negotiations, known as the Deuba Talks, with both the deposed government and the Alliance Party, which most indigenous Fijians supported. These negotiations culminated in the Deuba Accord of 23 September 1987, which provided for a government of national unity, in which both parties would be represented under the leadership of the Governor-General.

Fearing that the gains of the first coup were about to be lost, Rabuka staged a second coup on 25 September, abolished the monarchy on 6 October, and declared Fiji a republic. Penaia Ganilau resigned as Governor-General on 15 October 1987, and Fiji was expelled from the Commonwealth of Nations.

Ten years later, after constitutional talks and an election, Sitiveni Rabuka, who instigated the two military coups, presented a tabua, a tooth of a sperm whale, to Queen Elizabeth during the Commonwealth Heads of Government conference in Edinburgh, Scotland. This gesture from Rabuka, by now the Prime Minister of Fiji, is a traditional sign of profound respect and was given as an apology for having broken his oath of allegiance to her as an officer of the Military of Fiji. The agreed Constitution of 1997 provided for a President as Head of State of a Fijian republic, with the President chosen by the Great Council of Chiefs, a formal body of mostly hereditary chiefs.

Current position

Though Fiji has been a republic since 1987 and was suspended from the Commonwealth for a second time in 2009, until 2012 the Queen's effigy was still displayed on Fiji's currency and the Queen's Official Birthday remained a public holiday. In 2012, Frank Bainimarama's government abolished the official birthday holiday, and replaced the Queen's image on banknotes and coins with indigenous flora and fauna. The St Edward's Crown still forms part of the badges of the military and the police. The Queen and the royal family retained widespread affection among the Fijian people, and there have also been sporadic public debates on whether to return to a constitutional monarchy. The motto of the republic remains "Fear God and honour the King" or "Fear God and honour the King", which was adopted by Cakobau in 1871.

In 1998, the Great Council of Chiefs debated Elizabeth II's role as "supreme tribal chief", and as the Sovereign of Fiji. In 2002, on behalf of the Council, the Council's chairman, Ratu Epeli Ganilau, the son of Ratu Sir Penaia Ganilau, said that "the royal 'Tui Viti' and the 'Vunivalu' titles had been bestowed upon the English throne in a traditional installation procedure in 1902 and confirmed in 1937". He reiterated that Elizabeth II was still the traditional Queen or paramount chief of Fiji or Tui Viti, even though this position no longer conferred any constitutional prerogatives and it was "not widely known that she is the paramount chief of Fiji in the traditional sense; only some of the council members remembered her status".

As Queen Elizabeth II made no official claim to the Tui Viti title, and it is not officially recognised by the current de facto Fijian government, it remains dormant in usage. When broached on the subject of restoration by Sitiveni Rabuka during a meeting with the Queen in 1997, her response was simple: "Let the people decide".

After another coup in 2000, further political tension led to a fourth coup in 2006. The Great Council of Chiefs was suspended in 2007, and the Constitution, which gives the Council the right to appoint the Head of State from among its members, was suspended in 2009. On 14 March 2012, the Council was formally de-established.

In the last two decades since Fiji became a republic, the question on restoring the monarchy has not abated. The former Prime Minister Frank Bainimarama displayed portraits of the former Queen and her consort, Prince Philip, Duke of Edinburgh, above his office desk. He has also described himself as a monarchist: "I'm still loyal to the Queen. Many people are in Fiji. One of the things I'd like to do is see her restored as our monarch, to be Queen of Fiji again."

List of Fijian monarchs

Notes

References

Sources 

 
 
 
 Matanitu The Struggle for Power in Early Fiji, By David Routledge, Published by University of the South Pacific (1985)
 The Pacific Way A Memoir, By Ratu Sir Kamisese Mara, Published by the University of Hawaii Press (1990)
 Fiji and the Fijians Chapter 2 Pages 33–34 by Thomas Williams, James Calvert.

Fiji and the Commonwealth of Nations
Monarchy in Fiji
Fijian nobility
Government of Fiji
Politics of Fiji
Fiji
Heads of state of Fiji
History of Fiji
Fiji
Former monarchies of Oceania
Political history of Fiji
1987 disestablishments in Fiji